Robert Cleckler Bowden (November 8, 1929 – August 8, 2021) was an American college football coach. Bowden coached the Florida State Seminoles of Florida State University (FSU) from 1976 to 2009 and is considered one of the greatest college football coaches of all time for his accomplishments with the Seminoles.

During his time at Florida State, Bowden led FSU to an Associated Press and Coaches Poll National Title in 1993 and a BCS National Championship in 1999, as well as twelve Atlantic Coast Conference championships once FSU joined the conference in 1991. Bowden's Seminoles finished as an AP top-5 team for 14 consecutive seasons, setting a record which doubled the closest program. However, the program weakened during the mid-2000s, and after a difficult 2009 season Bowden was fired by President T.K. Wetherell, just weeks after his 80th birthday. He made his final coaching appearance in the 2010 Gator Bowl game on January 1, 2010, with a 33–21 victory over his former program, West Virginia.

Bowden spent the last part of his career in a race with Joe Paterno to become the winningest NCAA Division I college football coach of all time. The coaches overtook each other throughout the 2000s, sitting just a game apart before the 2008 college football season. However, on March 6, 2009, an NCAA ruling required Florida State to "vacate wins for any games in which an ineligible player participated", threatening to remove as many as fourteen of Bowden's wins from the 2006 and 2007 seasons in relation to an academic scandal. Florida State appealed the ruling, but the NCAA upheld it on January 5, 2010. Upon final investigation by FSU, it was determined that Bowden was to vacate 12 wins, bringing his final career record to 377–129–4, second to Paterno's final tally of 409 wins.

Youth and early life
Bowden was born in Birmingham, Alabama, the son of Bob Bowden and Sunset Bowden. When he was 13 years old, Bowden was diagnosed with rheumatic fever. After a six-month hospital stay, he was confined to his bed at home for just over a year. While ill, Bowden passed the time by listening to World War II reports on the radio, beginning an interest in the war which lasted throughout his lifetime. It was also around this time where he began to follow college football, as he would listen to University of Alabama football on Saturday mornings.

Bowden was an outstanding football player at Woodlawn High School in Birmingham, and accepted a scholarship to play for the University of Alabama as a quarterback. He then returned to Birmingham after only one semester and eloped with his high school sweetheart, Ann Estock, on April 1, 1949. Bowden transferred to Howard College (now known as Samford University), where he played football, baseball, ran track and became a brother in Pi Kappa Alpha. In his junior year, he was elected president of Pi Kappa Alpha. His senior year, he was re-elected to the presidency as well as captain of the football team, where he garnered "Little All-America" honors as quarterback. The Howard College faculty nominated him for Who's Who Among Students in American Universities & Colleges in recognition of his academic and athletic leadership. Bowden graduated from Howard in 1953.

Early coaching career
Bowden served as an assistant football coach and head track and field coach at Howard College (now known as Samford University) in Birmingham, Alabama from 1954–55. He left his alma mater to become athletic director as well as head football, baseball, and basketball coach at South Georgia College from 1956 to 1958. After a losing basketball season, Bowden fired himself as head coach. Bowden then returned to Howard as head coach, where he compiled a 31–6 record between 1959 and 1962. In 1962, Bowden went to Florida State University as an assistant coach under head coach Bill Peterson. Bowden left Florida State in 1965 to go to West Virginia University (WVU) as an assistant under Jim Carlen. When Carlen left following the 1969 season to become head coach at Texas Tech, Bowden replaced him. Bowden then compiled a 42–26 record at WVU before returning to FSU as head coach in 1976.

During Bowden's first year as head coach at WVU, the football team of the state's other top-division school, Marshall University, was killed in a plane crash. He asked NCAA permission to wear Marshall jerseys and play Marshall's final game of the 1970 season against Ohio, but was denied. In memory of the victims of the crash, Mountaineers players put green crosses and the initials "MU" on their helmets. Bowden allowed Marshall's new head coach Jack Lengyel and his assistants access to game film and playbooks to acquaint themselves with the veer offense, a variation of the option offense which aids teams with weak offensive lines. Lengyel credits Bowden with helping the young Thundering Herd recover. Bowden reportedly became emotional while viewing the movie We Are Marshall, and has said that he was the original candidate for the Marshall head coaching job filled by crash victim Rick Tolley.

Florida State

Bowden made the move to become the head coach of the Florida State Seminoles in 1976 the same place where he had coached wide receivers because the climate was warmer than in Morgantown, and because Tallahassee was closer to Birmingham, Alabama, where his mother and mother-in-law both lived. The team had a 4–29 record over the previous three seasons and he planned to stay only briefly before taking a better job, perhaps as head coach at Alabama.

Bowden became very successful very quickly at Florida State. By his second year, Bowden faced rumors he would leave for another job; the team went 9–2, compared to the four wins total in the three seasons before Bowden. He said he would be content to finish his career at Florida State, however, and reportedly told another athletic-department employee he would "never coach anywhere north of Tallahassee". During 34 years as head coach he had only one losing season–his first, in 1976–and declined head coaching job offers from Alabama, Auburn, LSU, and the National Football League's Atlanta Falcons. From 1987 to 2000, the Seminoles finished every season with at least 10 wins and in the top 5 of the Associated Press College Football Poll, and won the national championship in 1993 and 1999. The team was particularly dominant after joining the Atlantic Coast Conference (ACC) in 1992, winning or sharing nine consecutive conference titles from 1992 to 2000, and only losing two conference games in that stretch.

Bowden's tenure crested with a third consecutive appearance in the national championship game after the 2000 season, a loss to Oklahoma in the 2001 Orange Bowl. They opened the following season with an upset 41–9 loss to North Carolina, only the third loss they had ever suffered in ACC play. They finished 8–4, the first time they had lost that many games in 15 years. It also marked the first time since joining the ACC where they did not win at least a share of the ACC title; indeed, their two losses in ACC play were as many as they had suffered in their first nine years in the league. From then on, Bowden notched one more appearance in the top 10 of a final media poll, in 2003–which was also the last time he won 10 games in a season.

The Bowden Bowl
As both Florida State and Clemson are in the same division of the ACC for football, the two teams played each other every year from 1999 through 2007 in a game that became known as the "Bowden Bowl". Their 1999 meeting was the first time in Division I-A history that a father and a son met as opposing head coaches in a football game. Bobby held the edge in the series 5–4, with all four losses within the last five games.

One Bowden Bowl was scheduled between Auburn and Florida State for 1999 when Terry Bowden was the coach at Auburn. However, Terry's midseason resignation in 1998 ended the possibility of a Bowden Bowl. Another Bowden Bowl was scheduled between Clemson and Florida State in 2008, but Tommy Bowden's resignation halfway through the year ended the Bowden Bowls.

Personal life and death
Bowden married Ann Estock, his childhood sweetheart, in 1949 and the couple raised six children and 21 grandchildren. Bowden was a Christian who credited his success in football to his faith. He twice endorsed and supported US President Donald Trump, in the 2016 and 2020 presidential elections.

Bowden was not the only member of his family to have coached Division I-A football. His son Tommy Bowden was the head coach at Clemson University. Another son, Terry Bowden, was the head coach at Auburn University, where he was the 1993 Coach of the Year. A third son, Jeff Bowden, was the offensive coordinator at Florida State. All three Bowden men who were head coaches have achieved an undefeated season: Terry in 1993 at Auburn; Tommy in 1998 at Tulane; and Bobby in 1999 at Florida State. Bobby's 1993 and 1999 Florida State teams were the only ones to win a national championship, however.

Bowden was diagnosed with COVID-19 in October 2020. On July 21, 2021, it was reported that Bowden was diagnosed with a terminal medical condition. On July 23, his son reported that the condition was pancreatic cancer. He died the morning of August 8. He lay in honor in the rotunda of the Florida Capitol Building on August 13. He then lay repose at the Moore Athletic Center outside of Doak Campbell Stadium later that day. A memorial service was held for Bowden in the Tucker Civic Center in Tallahassee on August 14.  Bowden then lay in repose in the Reid Chapel at Samford University on August 15, prior to burial in Trussville, Alabama.

Awards

Bowden was awarded the Bobby Dodd Coach of the Year Award for 1980. He received the Walter Camp Coach of the Year Award for 1991. In 1992 Bowden received the United States Sports Academy's Amos Alonzo Stagg Coaching Award in recognition of his outstanding achievement as a coach.

Awards named after him
On March 21, 2010, the Over the Mountain Touchdown Club of Birmingham, Alabama presented the first annual Bobby Bowden National Collegiate Coach of the Year Award, named in honor of Bowden and the contributions that he made during his career. The award recognizes a coach each year with unmatched success on and off of the field in the same attributes that Bowden showed throughout his career: perseverance, attitude, integrity, and determination. University of Alabama head coach Nick Saban was the first recipient of the award, and it was presented by Bowden himself. The award is presented each year after national signing day and before the commencement of Spring practice.

In 2003, the Fellowship of Christian Athletes presented the first of what is now a yearly award in Bowden's name. The award was initiated by former Bowden assistant coach Vince Gibson and former Bowden player Vernon Brinson. It honors one college football player for his achievements on the field, in the classroom and in the community. In 2013, the Seminole Tribe of Florida became the official sponsor of the award. The Seminole Tribe of Florida Bobby Bowden Student-Athlete of the Year Award is presented each year prior to the College Football Playoff (CFP) national title.

In 2011, in recognition of his philanthropic efforts with the Fellowship of Christian Athletes, Bowden received the Children's Champion Award for Leadership Development from the charitable organization Children's Hunger Fund.

Head coaching record
In his 44 seasons as a head coach, Bowden had 40 winning seasons (including 33 consecutive at Florida State), and 36 Division I-A winning seasons. From 1987 through 2000, Bowden coached Florida State to 14 straight seasons with 10 or more victories, and his team had a final ranking in the top five of the major polls.

^ The 1983 season includes a forfeit win vs. Tulane.
‡ For the 2006 and 2007 seasons 12 wins, including 6 conference wins, were vacated for use of ineligible players. 5 wins from 2006 (including 2 conference wins) and 7 wins from 2007 (including 4 conference wins) were ultimately vacated by the NCAA.

Coaching tree
Assistant coaches under Bobby Bowden who became NCAA head coaches:

 Brad Scott
 Mark Richt
 Chuck Amato
 Tommy Bowden
 Terry Bowden
 Rick Stockstill
 Skip Holtz
 Kirby Smart
 Daryl Dickey
 Jimbo Fisher
 Manny Diaz

Bibliography
Bobby Bowden has co-authored several books, including:
Winning's Only Part of the Game: Lessons of Life and Football (1996)
The Bowden Way: 50 Years of Leadership Wisdom (2001)
Bobby Bowden's Tales from the Seminole Sideline (2004)
Called to Coach: Reflections on Life, Faith, and Football (2010)

Books about Bobby Bowden's early coaching years:
Bobby Bowden: Memories of A Legend and his Boys from South Georgia College (2008)

Books about Bobby Bowden's entire career:
Bobby Bowden: Win by Win (2003)
Bowden: How Bobby Bowden Forged a Football Dynasty  (2003)
Pure Gold: Bobby Bowden – An Inside Look (2004)

Books that feature contributions from Bobby Bowden:
Grateful: From Walking On To Winning It All At Florida State by Ryan Sprague, (2010)

See also

 List of College Football Hall of Fame inductees (coaches)
 List of college football coaches with 200 wins

References

Footnotes

External links
 Florida State profile
 

1929 births
2021 deaths
American football quarterbacks
Alabama Crimson Tide football players
Florida State Seminoles football coaches
Samford Bulldogs football coaches
Samford Bulldogs football players
West Virginia Mountaineers football coaches
South Georgia State Hawks baseball coaches
South Georgia State Hawks football coaches
Junior college men's basketball coaches in the United States
College Football Hall of Fame inductees
Players of American football from Birmingham, Alabama
Players of American football from Tallahassee, Florida
21st-century American male writers
Sportswriters from Florida
Writers from Birmingham, Alabama
Writers from Tallahassee, Florida
Articles containing video clips
Journalists from Alabama
Leaders of the Fellowship of Christian Athletes
20th-century American male writers
20th-century American non-fiction writers
21st-century American non-fiction writers
American male non-fiction writers
Deaths from pancreatic cancer
Deaths from cancer in Florida